Kagin may refer to:

Edwin Kagin (1940–2014), American lawyer
Kagin, Iran, a village